The 2004 CONCACAF Futsal Championship was the 3rd edition of the CONCACAF Futsal Championship, the quadrennial international futsal championship organised by CONCACAF for the men's national teams of the North, Central American and Caribbean region.  The tournament was held in Heredia, Costa Rica between 23 July–1 August 2004.  A total of eight teams played in the tournament.

Same as previous editions, the tournament acted as the CONCACAF qualifiers for the FIFA Futsal World Cup.  The top two teams of the tournament qualified for the 2004 FIFA Futsal World Championship in Chinese Taipei as the CONCACAF representatives.

Qualification

Qualified teams
The following eight teams qualified for the final tournament.

Venues
The matches were played at the Palacio de los Deportes in Heredia.

Squads

Group stage
The top two teams of each group advanced to the semi-finals.  The semi-final winners qualified for the 2004 FIFA Futsal World Championship. The teams were ranked according to points (3 points for a win, 1 point for a draw, 0 points for a loss). If tied on points, tiebreakers would be applied in the following order:
Goal difference in all group matches;
Greatest number of goals scored in all group matches;
Greatest number of points obtained in the group matches between the teams concerned;
Goal difference resulting from the group matches between the teams concerned;
Greater number of goals scored in all group matches between the teams concerned;
Drawing of lots.

All times were local, CST (UTC−6).

Group A

Group B

Knockout stage
In the knockout stage, extra time and penalty shoot-out would be used to decide the winner if necessary.

Bracket

Semi-finals

Third place playoff

Final

Winner

Final ranking

References

External links
Futsal, CONCACAF.com

2004
Concacaf
2004 in futsal
International futsal competitions hosted by Costa Rica
2004–05 in Costa Rican football